Claire Harman is a British writer and critic.

As a literary critic and book reviewer Harman has written for the Times Literary Supplement, Literary Review, Evening Standard, the Sunday Telegraph and other publications. Harman is a fellow of the Royal Society of Literature, and has taught English at the Universities of Oxford and Manchester. She has also taught creative writing at Columbia University.

Harman won the John Llewellyn Rhys Prize in 1989 for her biography of poet Sylvia Townsend Warner. Her subsequent biographical subjects include Fanny Burney and Robert Louis Stevenson.

In 2009, Harman published Jane's Fame, a book about the posthumous fame of novelist Jane Austen.

In September 2015, Harman won the Forward Prize for Best Single Poem of the year for "The Mighty Hudson", first published in the Times Literary Supplement.

Bibliography

Biographies
1989 — Sylvia Townsend Warner, Chatto & Windus/Minerva
2000 — Fanny Burney, HarperCollins
2005 — Robert Louis Stevenson, HarperCollins
2015 — Charlotte Brontë: A Life, Viking Penguin
2016 — Charlotte Brontë: A Fiery Heart, Knopf Doubleday Publishing Group
2022 — All Sorts of Lives: Katherine Mansfield and the Art of Risking Everything, Chatto & Windus

Criticism
2009 — Jane's Fame Canongate

Other non-fiction
2019 — Murder by the Book: The Crime That Shocked Dickens's London, Knopf

References

External links

Living people
English biographers
English short story writers
English literary critics
Women literary critics
Fellows of the Royal Society of Literature
John Llewellyn Rhys Prize winners
Year of birth missing (living people)